The Norwegian National Cycle Routes (Nasjonale sykkelrute) form the national cycling route network of Norway. There are currently 10 such long-distance cycling routes, criss-crossing Norway and these were established mainly to promote bicycle tourism.

Routes
 the list of Norwegian National Cycle Routes is as follows:
 Svinesund to Kirkenes
 Porsgrunn to Stavanger
 Kristiansand, Setesdal and Hardanger
 Bergen, Finse, Oslo
 Larvik, Kongsberg, Geilo
 Røros to Hardanger
 Halden, Oslo, Nidaros
 Oppdal to Molde
 Halden to Trondheim
 Northcape to Lindesnes

See also
 EuroVelo
 LF-routes, the national cycling route network of the Netherlands.
 National Cycle Network, the national cycling route network of the United Kingdom.

References

External links
Syklist Velkommen – tips til sykkelferien: National cycle routes (Link not working as of 12 Apr 2022)

National cycling route networks
Cycling in Norway